The FairTax Book is a non-fiction book by libertarian radio talk show host Neal Boortz and Congressman John Linder, published on August 2, 2005, as a tool to increase public support and understanding for the FairTax plan.  Released by ReganBooks, the hardcover version held the #1 spot on the New York Times Best Seller list for the last two weeks of August 2005 and remained in the top ten for seven weeks.  The paperback reprint of the book in May 2006 contains additional information and an afterword. It also spent several weeks on the New York Times Best Seller list. Boortz stated that he donates his share of the proceeds to charity to promote the book.

The book was published as a companion to the Fair Tax Act of 2005, which was a bill in the 109th United States Congress for changing tax laws to replace the Internal Revenue Service (IRS) and all federal income taxes (including AMT), payroll taxes (including Social Security and Medicare taxes), corporate taxes, capital gains taxes, gift taxes, and estate taxes with a national retail sales tax, to be levied once at the point of purchase on all new goods and services. The proposal also calls for an advance monthly tax rebate to households of citizens and legal resident aliens, to "untax" purchases up to the poverty level. The bill was reintroduced in January 2007 as the Fair Tax Act of 2007.

The sequel to The FairTax Book, FairTax: The Truth: Answering the Critics, was released by HarperCollins on February 12, 2008.  The book was published as a follow up to answer questions and respond to critics of the FairTax plan, and achieved #4 on the New York Times Best Seller list for the week of March 2, 2008 for paperback nonfiction.

See also 

 Americans For Fair Taxation

References

External links 
 Excerpt from The Fair Tax Book (Official publisher web page)
 Excerpt from FairTax: The Truth (Official publisher web page)
 Neal Boortz Website
 John Linder's FairTax Site
 John Linder's Congress Site
 FairTax.org – Americans For Fair Taxation
 Amazon.com's book reviews and description
 Barnes & Noble's editorial reviews and overview
 OnTheIssues.org's book review and excerpts
 After Words interview with Linder on The FairTax Book, December 17, 2005

FairTax Book
2005 non-fiction books
2008 non-fiction books
Books about politics of the United States
Books about economic policy
Libertarian books
ReganBooks books